The 1995 Tulsa Golden Hurricane football team represented the University of Tulsa during the 1995 NCAA Division I-A football season. In their eighth year under head coach David Rader, the Golden Hurricane compiled a 4–7 record.  The team's statistical leaders included quarterback Troy DeGar with 1,304 passing yards, Reggie Williams with 729 rushing yards, and Michael Kedzior with 620 receiving yards.

Schedule

References

Tulsa
Tulsa Golden Hurricane football seasons
Tulsa Golden Hurricane football